Bombycomorpha is a genus of moths in the family Lasiocampidae. The genus was erected by Felder in 1874.

Species
Bombycomorpha bifascia Walker, 1855
Bombycomorpha dukei Joannou & Gurkovich, 2009
Bombycomorpha pallida Distant, 1897

External links

Lasiocampidae